The Men's 50 metre rifle prone event at the 2018 Commonwealth Games was held on 10 April at the Belmont Shooting Centre, Brisbane.

Results

Qualification
Each shooter fired at the target 60 times. The top eight shooters advanced to the final.

Final
In the first competition stage, each shooter fired at the target 10 times. Their aggregate scores were carried over to the second competition stage, in which the lowest-ranked shooter was eliminated for every two shots taken.

References

Men's 50 metre rifle prone